= Kutaranatti =

- Village
- Country: India
- State: Karnataka
- District: Belgaum

Languages
  - Official: Kannada
- Time zone: UTC+5:30 (IST)

Kutaranatti is a village in Belgaum district in Karnataka, India.

== Population ==
As per population census 2011, this medium-sized village has a population of 1177. The male population is 603 and female population is 574. Population of children (aged 0-6) is 198 which makes up 16.82% of total population. Average sex ratio of the village is 952 and child sex ratio 922. Literacy rate of Kutaranatti is 59.35%, among which male literacy rate is 73.40% and female literacy rate 44.68%.
